Waltzed in from the Rumbling is the fourth full-length album by Canadian indie rock band Plants and Animals, released April 29, 2016 on Secret City Records.

Track listing
 "We Were One" – 4:55
 "No Worries Gonna Find Us" – 4:51
 "Fata Morgana" – 1:14
 "Stay" – 3:08
 "All of the Time" – 3:41
 "So Many Nights" – 3:47
 "Flowers" – 3:05
 "Je voulais te dire" – 7:02
 "Off the Water" – 4:08
 "Johnny Is a Drummer" – 2:36
 "Pure Heart" – 3:27

References

2016 albums
Plants and Animals albums
Secret City Records albums